Pan American Airways was the name from 1927 until 1950 of Pan American World Airways, an American airline that operated from 1927 to 1991.

Pan American Airways may also refer to:

 Pan American Airways (1996–1998), an American airline that operated from 1996 to 1998
 Pan American Airways (1998–2004), an American airline that operated from 1998 to 2004